Essential is the first compilation released by Kate Ryan. The album was released by the labels EMI and Capitol in early June 2008.

Track listing

Désenchantée   
Je t'adore   
Alive [French Version]   
All For You   
Libertine     
Only If I     
The Promise You Made     
Mon coeur résiste encore   
UR (My Love)    
Je lance un appel    
The Rain    
Goodbye    
Alive    
Scream for More
Voyage Voyage
Ella, elle l' a

Charts

References 

2008 compilation albums
Kate Ryan albums
Capitol Records compilation  albums